Thierry Mutin is a French singer of classical music and songwriter (born in Rochechouart, Haute-Vienne), famous for his 1988 hit single "Sketch of Love".

Biography
In 1984, Thierry Mutin released the single "Milliardaire comme personne". In 1988, he recorded in English-language the song "Sketch of Love", based on the suite n°11 (sarabande) of Georg Friedrich Haendel, which achieved success in France (#3 on the SNEP Singles Chart, Gold disc). In 1989, he participated in the charity single "Pour toi Arménie", led by Charles Aznavour. He published the albums Talisman in 1990, whose music was composed by Jean-Pierre Bourtayre, and Chants du Monde Nouveau in 1995. He also wrote some songs for Jean-Jacques Lafon.

References

Living people
People from Haute-Vienne
20th-century French male opera singers
Year of birth missing (living people)